Hot Animal Machine is the debut solo album by Henry Rollins which served as a precursor to the Rollins Band. It is only available now in the same 2-in-one package as Drive by Shooting. Notable for a number of cover songs; Suicide's "Ghost Rider", Richard Berry's "Crazy Lover" and The Velvet Underground's "I'm Gonna Move Right In". The cover was drawn by Mark Mothersbaugh, the frontman of the popular 1980s group Devo.

Track listing

Accolades

Personnel 

Musicians
 Mick Green – drums
 Chris Haskett – electric guitar, production
 Henry Rollins – vocals, production
 Bernie Wandel – bass guitar

Technical personnel
 Geoff Clout – engineering, mixing
John Golden – mastering
 Mark Mothersbaugh – illustrations

Release history

References

External links 
 

1987 debut albums
Henry Rollins albums
Texas Hotel Records albums